Don't Talk to Strange Men is a 1962 black and white British crime thriller film directed by Pat Jackson and produced at Marylebone Film Studios and on location in Buckinghamshire.

Plot

As a prologue an unseen driver gives a lift to a woman. He attacks her. We next see her body being discovered by children playing in a hay shed.

Jean, a teenage schoolgirl waits for a bus on a quiet country lane. The telephone in a nearby call box rings and she answers it. She is fascinated by the conversation with a man and agrees to chat again the next day. The bus arrives (a double decker) and Jean discusses the situation with the conductress.

In the Painter house Ann, the precocious younger daughter, decides she does not want to eat the rabbit which he shot. Jean gets home safely and the father lectures her regarding talking to strange men. Jean and Ann share a bedroom and she tells Ann of the phone call.

The next day at the same time and place the phone rings again and she eagerly answers. He ensures she is alone. She falls in love with the unseen man, but gives a false name: Samantha.

On the third day he doesn't call at the normal time. She misses her bus but also misses the eventual call when a woman (Mrs Mason) uses the call box. She goes back to the pub where she is working, The Chequers, and Ron rings her dad to come and collect her.

On the fourth day he calls but is annoyed about the previous day. He seems to hang up. A man appears in a sports car and wants to use the call box. The man rings back and says he got cut off. He chats her up and says how much he loves her voice. They arrange to meet the next day at 9.50. She promises to tell no-one and promises not to talk to strange men.

Dad bans her going to work on the critical night but she pretends to go into town with her sister to see the cinema. They split. She confesses to the bus conductress her plan to meet. She is unimpressed. She warns her not to meet the man but she gets off at the remote call box. A drunk man wanders up the lane and she goes into a field and hides in a shed. She daydreams about his voice. She then thinks about her sister. The sister leaves the cinema as she is worried about Jean.

The man goes into The Chequers and orders a brandy from Ron. We only see him from behind, but it is his voice and he asks to use the phone at 9.50pm. Ironically Jean scares herself and runs to The Chequers. She sees his face (we do not). She watches as he calls the phone box. Ann has arrived at the phone box and she answers but says little. Ann phones the police to come to the call box. Jean tells Ron the story and calls the call box. She struggles to remember the number. Ann answers and is told to hide but it is too late. He has arrived. He thinks it is Samantha and drags her to his car and races off. Ron arrives and stops the car and fights the man. The police arrive.

We never see the face of the man.

Cast
Christina Gregg as Jean Painter
 Janina Faye as Ann Painter
 Cyril Raymond as Mr. Painter
 Gillian Lind as Mrs. Painter
 Conrad Phillips as Ron
 Dandy Nichols as Molly the bus conductor
 Gwen Nelson as Mrs. Mason
 Robin Hunter as the man in the sports car

Critical reception
In the Radio Times, Tony Sloman wrote "This worthy little feature with a social message is more interesting now for its depiction of early 1960s Britain," and concluded that "director Pat Jackson's thriller still has relevance today."

References

External links

1962 films
1960s crime thriller films
1960s serial killer films
British crime thriller films
Films directed by Pat Jackson
British black-and-white films
Films shot in Buckinghamshire
1960s English-language films
1960s British films